Peter Klappert (born 1942 in Rockville Centre, New York) is an American poet.

Life
He grew up in West Hempstead, New York, and Rowayton, Connecticut. He graduated from Cornell University and the University of Iowa, with an M.A. and an M.F.A.

His work has appeared in AGNI, Antaeus, Atlantic Monthly, Harper's, Ploughshares, AWP Chronicle, Lambda Book Report, The Gettysburg Review, and The Southern Review.

He was Briggs-Copeland Lecturer at Harvard University, and Writer-in-Residence at College of William and Mary.

He taught at Rollins College and New College of Florida, and George Mason University before retiring in 2006.

Awards
 1971 Yale Younger Poets Award
 1973 National Endowment for the Arts grant
 Ingram Merrill Foundation grant
 Yaddo resident fellowship
 The MacDowell Colony resident fellowship
 La Fondation Karolyi resident fellowship
 The Millay Colony for the Arts resident fellowship

Works
"The Cat Lover", AGNI 4, 1975
"Enrichissez Vous", AGNI 4, 1975
"Variegations", AGNI 4, 1975
"Satan Who Is Most Noisy When He Whispers", AGNI 12, 1980
"If Innocent", Ploughshares, Summer 1981 
"The Prime of Life", Ploughshares, Winter 1991-92 
"CHOKECHERRIES"; "IMPATIENS"; "DOSTOEVSKI SAID MAN"; "CLOSING IN NEW HAVEN"; "THE COURTSHIP OF THE MORTICIANS"; "J'ACCUSE", Beltway Poetry Quarterly Volume 3, Number 1, Winter 2002
"CEREBRAL CORTEX", Six Gallerys Press
 How I Stopped Writing Poetry and Other Poems

Anthologies

References

External links
"In His Own Words—An interview with poet Peter Klappert", Poetry Santa Cruz
"In the Poet's Spotlight for May 2007:  Peter Klappert"

American male poets
1942 births
Cornell University alumni
University of Iowa alumni
Rollins College faculty
New College of Florida faculty
George Mason University faculty
Living people
Yale Younger Poets winners
People from Rockville Centre, New York
People from West Hempstead, New York
Writers from Norwalk, Connecticut